Robert Derrell Griffith (born December 12, 1943) is an American former professional baseball player. The outfielder and third baseman appeared in 124 games played in Major League Baseball for the Los Angeles Dodgers over parts of four seasons (–). Griffith was born in Anadarko, Oklahoma.

Griffith graduated from high school in his hometown and attended Southwestern Oklahoma State University. He signed with the Dodgers before the  season and posted solid offensive statistics in levels from Class B to Triple-A. After a one-game stint with Los Angeles in September , he was recalled by the Dodgers for an extended stay in MLB in June . He started 35 games at third base and another 27 in the outfield for the 1964 Dodgers and batted .290 with five three-hit games. His 69 total hits included 16 doubles and four home runs.

But 1964 was Griffith's only sustained service and period of success in the majors. In , he was moved to left field in May when regular Tommy Davis broke an ankle. Griffith was batting .133 in nine games started when he lost the regular job to Lou Johnson and he returned to Triple-A for the heart of the regular season. Griffith kept the injury a secret for almost 50 years until revealing it in an interview on an Oklahoma City television station in May 2015. He collected only one more major league hit in 1966 before returning to the minors.

The Dodgers then packaged Griffith (with Tommy Davis) in a four-player trade to the New York Mets after the 1966 season, but he failed to stick with the Mets, and spent 1967, his last year in pro ball, in the minors in the Houston Astros' and Atlanta Braves' organizations.

As a major leaguer, Griffith collected 77 career hits, batting .260 with five homers and 33 runs batted in. As of 2015, he owned and operated a liquor store in Anadarko.

References

External links

1943 births
Living people
Albuquerque Dukes players
Arizona Instructional League Dodgers players
Austin Braves players
Baseball players from Oklahoma
Great Falls Electrics players
Los Angeles Dodgers players
Major League Baseball outfielders
Major League Baseball third basemen
Oklahoma City 89ers players
People from Anadarko, Oklahoma
Richmond Braves players
Spokane Indians players